Ian Davidson may refer to:
Ian Davidson (footballer, born 1947), English footballer
Ian Davidson (footballer, born 1937), Scottish footballer
Ian Davidson (British politician) (born 1950), former Scottish Labour Co-operative MP
Ian Davidson (South African politician) (born 1951), South African Democratic Alliance MP
Ian Davidson (scriptwriter), comedy scriptwriter
Ian Davidson (cricketer) (born 1964), English cricketer
Ian Damon (Ian Davidson, born 1935), Australian broadcaster and disc jockey
Ian Davidson (rugby union) (1877–1939), Irish rugby player

See also
Ian Davison (disambiguation)